Grammatonotus is a genus of fish in the family Callanthiidae native to the Indian and Pacific Ocean. These fish are ovoid to elongated in shape, with short, rounded snouts. The anterior nostril is tubular. They have large teeth with one to two canine teeth on each side. The scales are large.

Species
There are currently 11 recognized species in this genus:

 Grammatonotus ambiortus Prokofiev, 2006 (Purple and yellow groppo)
 Grammatonotus bianchi Lisher, Thein & Psomadakis 2021 (Myanmar groppo)
 Grammatonotus brianne W. D. Anderson, Greene & L. A. Rocha, 2016 (Batangas groppo)
 Grammatonotus crosnieri (Fourmanoir, 1981) (Crosnier's groppo)
 Grammatonotus lanceolatus (Kotthaus, 1976) (Lancet-tail groppo)
 Grammatonotus laysanus C. H. Gilbert, 1905 (Purple groppo)
 Grammatonotus macrophthalmus Katayama, Yamamoto & Yamakawa, 1982 (Bigeye groppo)
 Grammatonotus pelipel Anderson & Johnson 2017 (Pohnpeian groppo)
 Grammatonotus roseus (Günther, 1880) (Rosy groppo)
 Grammatonotus surugaensis Katayama, Yamakawa & K. Suzuki, 1980 (Suruga groppo)
 Grammatonotus xanthostigma Anderson & Johnson 2017 (Yellowspot groppo)

References 

Callanthiidae
Marine fish genera
Taxa named by Charles Henry Gilbert